The Institut de tourisme et d'hôtellerie du Québec (ITHQ) is an institution specializing in professional training related to tourism, hotel management and restaurant management. The ITHQ is the only school in Quebec that provides secondary-level, college-level, university-level and continuing education.

External links

Education in Montreal
Le Plateau-Mont-Royal
Cooking schools in North America
Hospitality schools